Bogdan Tošović (28 August 1918 – August 1941) was a Croatian water polo player. He competed for Yugoslavia in the men's tournament at the 1936 Summer Olympics. He died in the Jadovno concentration camp.

References

External links
 

1918 births
1941 deaths
Croatian male water polo players
Olympic water polo players of Yugoslavia
Water polo players at the 1936 Summer Olympics
Sportspeople from Dubrovnik
Croatian civilians killed in World War II
People who died in Jadovno concentration camp
Croatian people executed in Nazi concentration camps